The Episodes is the sixth studio album by American alternative metal band Taproot, released on April 12, 2012 through Victory Records. The album peaked at no. 21 on the Billboard Hard Rock charts with "No Surrender" peaking at no. 38 on the US Main. Rock charts. This is the last album with drummer Nick Fredell and longtime guitarist Mike DeWolf.

Track listing

Personnel
 Stephen Richards – vocals, guitar
 Mike DeWolf – guitar
 Phil Lipscomb – bass
 Nick Fredell – drums

References

2012 albums
Taproot (band) albums
Victory Records albums